Abdul Halim Tokmakçioğlu (born 1 July 1913, date of death unknown) was a Turkish fencer. He competed in the team sabre events at the 1936 Summer Olympics.

References

External links
 

1913 births
Year of death missing
Turkish male sabre fencers
Olympic fencers of Turkey
Fencers at the 1936 Summer Olympics